The 1899 Cincinnati Reds season was a season in American baseball. The team finished in sixth place in the National League with a record of 83–67, 16 games behind the Brooklyn Superbas.

Regular season 
The Reds were coming off a successful season in 1898, earning a third-place finish with a 92–60 record. However, they once again faded down the stretch, as the team was in first place in the first week of September before slumping for the remainder of the season.

Buck Ewing returned to manage Cincinnati for a fifth season. The Reds also purchased Kip Selbach from the Washington Senators during the off-season for $5,000. Selbach batted .303 with three home runs and 60 RBI with the Senators in 1898. The club also acquired Bill Phillips, who spent the 1898 season with the Indianapolis Hoosiers of the Western League, where he had a 29–8 record.  Phillips last played in the National League in 1895 with the Reds, going 6–7 with a 6.03 ERA. Twenty-year-old Noodles Hahn was also signed by Cincinnati, as he split the 1898 season with the Detroit Tigers and St. Paul Saints, going 12–20 between those two clubs.

Once again, Jake Beckley had a very solid offensive season, batting .333 with three home runs and 99 RBI, all team highs. Kip Selbach was also very solid, batting .297 with three home runs and 87 RBI, as well as scoring a team high 105 runs.

On the mound, Hahn was the ace, earning a 23–8 record with a 2.68 ERA in his rookie season. Hahn pitched a team high 309 innings, and struck out 145 batters. Phillips was also very solid, going 17–9 with a 3.32 ERA in 33 games.

Season summary 
Cincinnati started the season off on the right foot, going 14–7 in their opening twenty-one games, only 1.5 games out of first. However, a 7–15 mark over their next twenty-two games saw the team fall under the .500 level with a 24–25 record, sitting in seventh place, 14.5 games behind the Brooklyn Superbas. The team would remain around the .500 mark, as they were 40–41, before going on a franchise record fourteen-game winning streak. Cincinnati's record improved to 54–41, however, they still remained in fifth place, eight games behind Brooklyn.  The Reds then lost six of their next seven games to fall into sixth place, 12.5 games out.  At the end of the season, Cincinnati was a sixth place team with an 83–67 record, 19 games behind Brooklyn.

Season standings

Record vs. opponents

Roster

Player stats

Batting

Starters by position 
Note: Pos = Position; G = Games played; AB = At bats; H = Hits; Avg. = Batting average; HR = Home runs; RBI = Runs batted in

Other batters 
Note: G = Games played; AB = At bats; H = Hits; Avg. = Batting average; HR = Home runs; RBI = Runs batted in

Pitching

Starting pitchers 
Note: G = Games pitched; IP = Innings pitched; W = Wins; L = Losses; ERA = Earned run average; SO = Strikeouts

Other pitchers 
Note: G = Games pitched; IP = Innings pitched; W = Wins; L = Losses; ERA = Earned run average; SO = Strikeouts

Relief pitchers 
Note: G = Games pitched; W = Wins; L = Losses; SV = Saves; ERA = Earned run average; SO = Strikeouts

References

External links
1899 Cincinnati Reds season at Baseball Reference

Cincinnati Reds seasons
Cincinnati Reds season
Cincinnati Reds